Curses! is the debut release of Welsh band Future of the Left, released by Too Pure in 2007.

Track listing
 "The Lord Hates a Coward" – 3:34
 "Plague of Onces" – 3:03
 "Fingers Become Thumbs!" – 1:50
 "Manchasm" – 3:54
 "Fuck the Countryside Alliance" – 2:06
 "My Gymnastic Past" – 2:30
 "Suddenly It's a Folk Song" – 2:55
 "Kept by Bees" – 1:54
 "Small Bones Small Bodies" – 2:22
 "Wrigley Scott" – 2:06
 "Real Men Hunt in Packs" – 3:27
 "Team:Seed" – 1:19
 "adeadenemyalwayssmellsgood" – 3:09
 "The Contrarian" – 3:02

The iTunes version of the album contains the bonus track "I Need to Know How to Kill a Cat"
The Japanese version includes the above bonus track and "The Big Wide O". 
Both tracks were previously released as B-sides on the Small Bones Small Bodies single.

Personnel 

Andrew Falkous – Guitar, Piano, Keyboards, Vocals
Kelson Mathias - Bass, Vocals
Jack Egglestone - Drums
Sean McGee – Mastering
Richard Jackson - Engineering, Production
Jim 'Jim' Anderson - Engineering

References

Curses (Future of the Left album)
Curses (Future of the Left album)
Future of the Left albums